Chandpur District is a district located in Chattogram Division, Bangladesh. It was a part of the Cumilla District until 15 February 1984.

History
During the ruling of the Baro-Bhuiyans, this region was occupied by Chand Ray, the Zamindar of Bikrampur and son of Kedar Ray. According to historian J. M. Sengupta, the region was named Chandpur, following the name of Chand Ray. On the other hand, others say that the name of this region comes from Chand Faqir of Purindapur mahalla of Chandpur, Bangladesh. It is said that an administrator named Shah Ahmed Chand came here from Delhi in the fifteenth century and established a river port.

In 1779 AD, Major James Rennel, a British surveyor, drew a map of Bengal during the British rule and included an obscure town called Chandpur. At that time, there were offices and courts at a place called Narsinghpur (which has now sunk) south of Chandpur. The confluence of the Padma and the Meghna was about 60 miles south-west of the present place. This area has now disappeared due to the game of breaking the Meghna river.

The first Chandpur subdivision was formed in 1878 as a result of administrative reorganization during the British rule. On 1 October 1896, Chandpur city was declared as a municipality. It was declared as Chandpur district on 15 February 1984.

Geography
The Geological formation of Chandpur was taken place in Pleistocene and Holocene Era. Geographical history of Chandpur was found in the East-Indian country-map of Perguitar. In the map, south to Bangladesh, Sagornooper, to the north Pragjyotish and the Eastern plain beside hills was known as ‘Kiratas.’ The then Red River (Brammhaputra of today) borne alluvial soil contributed the formation of ‘Kiratas’ and Comilla was under it. That is Chandpur was under ‘Kiratas.’ In the map of Tomas Water, a land named ‘Srikhetra’ was shown to the south of the combined course of both the Titas and Gomati (probably). It is guessed that Chandpur and the west part of Noakhali were under ‘Srikhetra.’ In the map of Jean de Brosse in 1560, ‘Tropo’ was shown by river banks. This ‘Tropo’ was actually Tripura or Comilla region. That is, Chandpur was a part of Tripura. In the map of Portuguese sailor Sanson de Abevil in 1652, Bander, a place was marked where there was a big river port. This port was actually Chandpur. In 1779, English surveyor Major James Rennel drew a map where not only Tripura, but also Chandpur and Comilla were rightly spotted.

Demographics

According to the 2011 Bangladesh census, Chandpur District had a population of 2,416,018, of which 1,145,831 were males and 1,270,187 females. Rural population was 1,980,294 (81.97%) while the urban population was 435,724 (18.03%). Chandpur district had a literacy rate of 56.78% for the population 7 years and above: 56.14% for males and 57.34% for females.

Muslims make up 93.93% of the population, while Hindus are 6.02% of the population. The Hindu population has decreased from 1981.

Administrative subdivisions

Upazilas
Chandpur District is divided into the following sub-districts (upazilas):

 Chandpur Sadar Upazila
 Faridganj Upazila
 Haimchar Upazila
 Hajiganj Upazila
 Kachua Upazila
 Matlab Dakshin Upazila
 Matlab Uttar Upazila
 Shahrasti Upazila

Education 
 Chandpur Science & Technology University
 Chandpur Government College
 Chandpur Polytechnic Institute
 Chandpur Medical College
 Hasan Ali Government High School
Al-AMIN Academy School And College
 Matlabganj J. B. Pilot High School
 Sojatpur Degree  College
 Nandalalpur Samadia High School

Hajigonj Model Government College
 Chhenger Char Government High School
 Durgapur J.K High School
 Matripith Government Girls High School

Notable residents 
 Mohammad Abdullah, politician and academic
 Wahiduddin Ahmed, academic
 Shamsul Alam, State Minister of Planning
 Abul Kalam Azad, businessman, got his start trading coconuts from village to village in the district when he was a child.
 Kabir Bakul, lyricist and journalist
 Amena Begum, a former Member of Parliament of East Pakistan
 Nurjahan Begum, the first female journalist in Bangladesh
 Abidur Reza Chowdhury (1872–1961), politician and educationist
 Mizanur Rahman Chowdhury, former Prime Minister
 Humayun Kabir Dhali, author and journalist
 Dildar, actor
 Sabnam Faria, film and drama actress and model
 G. M. Fazlul Haque, politician
 Mohammad Anwar Hossain, army officer
 Neamat Imam, author
 Monirul Islam, artist
 Burhanuddin Khan Jahangir, academic and writer
 Mahmudul Hasan Joy, cricketer
 Shantanu Kaiser, poet and essayist
 Janab Ali Majumdar, Bengali politician
 Abu Naser Muhammad Ehsanul Haque Milan, politician
 Dipu Moni, Education Minister
 Mohammad Nasiruddin, journalist
 Tania Sultana Popy, actress
 Rezaul Karim Reza, footballer
 Nurul Amin Ruhul, also known as Ruhul Bhai, politician
 Shykh Seraj, journalist, media personality and agriculture development activist
 Farida Zaman, artist and illustrator

See also 
 Achalchhila
 Adra Ramchandrapur
 Adsa

Notes

References

 
Districts of Chittagong Division
Districts of Bangladesh